The 1948 Saint Mary's Gaels football team was an American football team that represented Saint Mary's College of California during the 1948 college football season. In their first season under head coach Joe Verducci, the Gaels compiled a 4–6 record and were outscored by opponents by a combined total of 161 to 150.

Schedule

References

Saint Mary's
Saint Mary's Gaels football seasons
Saint Mary's Gaels football